The Church of Jesus Christ of Latter-day Saints (LDS Church), headquartered in Salt Lake City, Utah, has been in Sweden since 1850.

History

The Book of Mormon was translated into Swedish in 1878. As with many other Scandinavian converts, Swedish LDS were encouraged to emigrate to the US and build up "Zion" there; these included the ancestors of a previous church president, Thomas S. Monson, whose grandfather, Nels Monson (born Torhamn), emigrated at the age of 16. This depleted local numbers for a number of decades, until in the late twentieth century, this policy was discontinued, and a temple built within the country itself.

As of 2021, the LDS Church counted its number of members in Sweden to be just above 9,528, divided into 5 regional units with a total of 40 congregations. This was an increase in membership from 2014, which was 9,463. The Church also maintains one temple in the country, the Stockholm Sweden Temple, in Västerhaninge.

The Swedish Rescue
Around 2010, a number of Swedish members of the LDS Church, including former area seventy Hans Mattsson, began to doubt the veracity of the church. Marlin K. Jensen, a church general authority, and historian Richard E. Turley Jr. soon after conducted a fireside, an informal church meeting, at the Västerhaninge Chapel in Stockholm, Sweden, on November 28, 2010. The audio was surreptitiously recorded and sparked much discussion and interest in the blogosphere.

Stakes

As of February 2023, the following stakes were located in Sweden:

Missions
 Sweden Stockholm Mission: On June 15, 1905, the Swedish Mission was organized from the Scandinavian Mission, which was renamed the Danish-Norwegian Mission. When established, the mission covered Sweden, Finland, Russia and northern Germany, with Petter Matson as its president. It has since been split among other missions, reducing the area of the mission to only Sweden.

Temples

See also

Religion in Sweden

References

External links
Official website 

 
1850 establishments in Sweden
Christianity in Stockholm
Religious organizations established in 1850
Christian denominations in Sweden